St James Buildings is a high-rise, Grade II listed building on Oxford Street, Manchester, England, completed in 1912. The building was constructed in the Edwardian Baroque style and has a Portland stone exterior reaching a maximum height of 60m.

History
The building opened in 1912 as the headquarters of the Calico Printers' Association Ltd, a company formed in 1899 from the amalgamation of 46 textile printing companies and 13 textile merchants. Companies involved in the merger included F. W. Grafton & Co, Edmund Potter & Co, Hoyle's Prints Ltd, John Gartside & Co, F. W. Ashton & Co, Rossendale Printing Company, Hewit & Wingate Ltd, and the Thornliebank Company Ltd.

The renovated building is leased to other businesses by its owner Bruntwood. Notable lessees include Kaplan Financial Ltd, the General Medical Council, BPP Law School, and the Arup Manchester office who were based on the 8th floor, the Medical Practitioners Tribunal Service and the Manchester city centre campus for Edge Hill University
 mainly for their Paramedic and their Operating department practitioner courses.

Architecture

The building is Edwardian Baroque in style, has a Portland stone exterior and reaches a maximum height of 60m. The architects Clegg, Fryer & Penman designed the long façade with three slightly protruding pavilions with grossly inflated pilasters and pediments; in the centre the principal pediment is topped by a stumpy tower which breaks through the cornice line. The lowest third of the façade is emphasized by rustication and by having a more elaborate arrangement of windows.

See also

Listed buildings in Manchester-M1

References

Grade II listed buildings in Manchester